Nizhnepauninskaya is a rural locality (a village) in Spasskoye Rural Settlement, Tarnogsky District, Vologda Oblast, Russia. The population was 112 as of 2002.

Geography 
Nizhnepauninskaya is located 23 km northwest of Tarnogsky Gorodok (the district's administrative centre) by road. Filimonovskaya is the nearest rural locality.

References 

Rural localities in Tarnogsky District